In India, a governor is the constitutional head of each of the twenty-eight states. The governor is appointed by the President of India for a term of five years, and holds office at the President's pleasure. The governor is de jure head of the state government; all its executive actions are taken in the governor's name. However, the governor must act on the advice of the popularly elected council of ministers, headed by the chief minister, who thus hold de facto executive authority at the state-level. The Constitution of India also empowers the governor to act upon their own discretion, such as the ability to appoint or dismiss a ministry, recommend President's rule, or reserve bills for the President's assent. Over the years, the exercise of these discretionary powers have given rise to conflict between the elected chief minister and the union government–appointed governor.

Sarojini Naidu was the first woman to become the governor of an Indian state. She governed Uttar Pradesh from 15 August 1947 to 2 March 1949.  Her daughter, Padmaja Naidu, is the longest-serving female governor with almost 11 years tenure in West Bengal. Tamilisai Soundararajan is the recentmost appointment as the first female governor of Telangana.

Governors
Key

 Incumbent Governor

Chronological list of lieutenant governors
Key
 Incumbent Lieutenant Governor

See also 

 List of female chief ministers in India
 List of female judges of the Supreme Court of India
 List of current Indian governors
 List of current Indian lieutenant governors and administrators

References

Governors
India